Spiridon, Serbian Patriarch, also known as  Spiridon I, was the archbishop of the Serbian Patriarchate of Peć and the Serbian patriarch from 1380 to 1389.

Biography 
He was elected at the council of the Serbian church in 1380, after the withdrawal from that place, of his predecessor, Patriarch Jefrem. Prince Lazar and the members of the council begged Patriarch Jefrem not to leave the patriarchal throne, but he was consistent and proposed to the members of the council as his successor Spiridon. When Prince Lazar, who convened the council, and the present archbishops and other participants realized that Patriarch Jefrem was determined, they listened to his advice and elected Spiridon as patriarch. The testimonies of Bishop Marko about that election and Ephraim's proposal remain, followed by a written trace in the Tronoški genealogy and the General Gazette.

The life path of Spiridon, until the election for the head of the Serbian Church, is little known. It is noted that he was born in Nis and that he was a brother of the monastery of St. Paneteleimon on Mount Athos. He belonged to a high circle of the Serbian cultural elite, which produced the greatest writers of that period, and who, in cooperation with other Slavic monasteries, introduced a new style of Church Slavonic orthography into Slavic literature. It is assumed that the introductory parts of the five charters of Prince Lazar, judging by the stylistic features, are the work of Patriarch Spiridon.

Activities 
Some sources state that Spiridon, before the election for the Serbian patriarch, was the bishop of Caesaropolis, and later the metropolitan in Melnik. This assumption is supported by two acts from the Vatopedi monastery on Mount Athos, in which, in October 1377, Metropolitan Spiridon is mentioned. One charter of Prince Lazar issued in 1379/80. year to the Hilandar monastery was confirmed by Patriarch Spiridon.

The name of Patriarch Spiridon is also associated with the so-called Gornjačka povelja. Patriarch Spiridon is also connected with the Charter on the founding of the Kinovit monastery Drenče in Župa near Aleksandrovac, the endowment of the monk Dorothea and his son Danilo, the later Serbian patriarch Danilo III. Nicodemus Mirceta, copying Letovnik in 1387 in the monastery of the Holy Archangels near Prizren, states that at that time "the Serbian Patriarch Cyrus Spiridon was on the throne".

On 19 January 1388, Patriarch Spiridon confirmed the creation of the endowment of the landowner Obrad Dragojlović, the church of the Most Holy Mother of God, in the village of Kukonj near Brvenik on the Ibar.

Serbian Patriarch Spiridon was on the throne of the Serbian Church in very difficult times, during the great invasion of the Turks, who in turn conquered Sofia, Sir, Ber and Ioannina. According to the testimonies of that time, he gave communion to the Serbian army before the Battle of Kosovo on the eve of Vidovdan in 1389.

Patriarch Spiridon survived the Kosovo tragedy for barely two months. He died on 11 August 1389. The relics of this Serbian saint are in the church of St. Demetrius in the Serbian Patriarchate of Peć.

See also
 List of heads of the Serbian Orthodox Church

Notes
 Sava Vuković, 1996, p. 464-465.

References

 "Serbian Patriarch Spiridon". Folk encyclopedia. Zagreb: Bibliographic Institute. 1927
 Vuković, Sava (1996). Serbian hierarchs from the ninth to the twentieth century. Euro, Unirex, Kalenić.
 Popović, Radomir V. (1989). "Church-Political Conditions in Serbia before the Battle of Kosovo in 1389" (PDF). Theology: Organ of the Orthodox Theological Faculty in Belgrade. 47 (1-2): 10-21.

1300s births
1389 deaths
Patriarchs of the Serbian Orthodox Church
Patriarchate of Peć
Archbishops of Serbs